Actiastes is a genus of ant-loving beetles in the family Staphylinidae. There are about nine described species in Actiastes.

Species
These nine species belong to the genus Actiastes:
 Actiastes desertorum Grigarick & Schuster, 1971
 Actiastes foveicollis (LeConte, 1878)
 Actiastes fovicinus Grigarick & Schuster, 1971
 Actiastes fundatum Grigarick & Schuster, 1971
 Actiastes globifer (LeConte, 1849)
 Actiastes globiferum (LeConte, 1849)
 Actiastes spatium Grigarick & Schuster, 1971
 Actiastes suteri (Park, 1963)
 Actiastes wagneri (Park, 1963)

References

Further reading

 
 

Pselaphinae
Articles created by Qbugbot